Omorani is a village in the municipality of Čaška, North Macedonia. It used to be part of the former municipality of Izvor.

Demographics
Toward the end of the 19th and beginning of the 20th centuries, Omorani traditionally was a mixed Orthodox Macedonian, Macedonian Muslim (Torbeš) and Muslim Albanian village. During the Balkan Wars (1912-1913) the Muslim population left the village and resettled in the village of Sogle.

According to the 2021 census, the village had a total of 152 inhabitants. Ethnic groups in the village include:

Macedonians 167
Others 5

References

Villages in Čaška Municipality
Macedonian Muslim villages
Albanian communities in North Macedonia